Dwight Sidney Allen was a member of the Wisconsin State Assembly.

Biography
Allen was born on February 12, 1843, in Lebanon, New York. During the American Civil War, he served with the 22nd Wisconsin Volunteer Infantry Regiment of the Union Army. He would take part in the Battle of Thompson's Station, Battle of Resaca, Battle of Kennesaw Mountain, Battle of Peachtree Creek and Sherman's March to the Sea. On September 4, 1867, Allen married Delia A. Sherman. He died on May 5, 1908.

Political career
Allen was elected to the Assembly in 1888. From 1877 to 1890, Allen was a member of the County Board of Walworth County, Wisconsin, serving as Chairman for much of that time. Additionally, he was Town Treasurer and Chairman of the Town Board (similar to city council) of Linn, Wisconsin, and a justice of the peace. He was a Republican.

References

People from Madison County, New York
People from Lake Geneva, Wisconsin
Republican Party members of the Wisconsin State Assembly
Wisconsin city council members
City and town treasurers in the United States
American justices of the peace
People of Wisconsin in the American Civil War
Union Army soldiers
1843 births
1908 deaths
19th-century American politicians
19th-century American judges